In invertebrates, the term parapodium (Gr. para, beyond or beside + podia, feet; plural: parapodia) refers to lateral outgrowths or protrusions from the body. Parapodia are predominantly found in annelids, where they are paired, unjointed lateral outgrowths that bear the chaetae. In several groups of sea snails and sea slugs, 'parapodium' refers to lateral fleshy protrusions.


Annelid parapodia

Most species of polychaete annelids have paired, fleshy parapodia which are segmentally arranged along the body axis. Parapodia vary greatly in size and form, reflecting a variety of functions, such as gas exchange, anchorage, protection and locomotion.

General description
Parapodia in polychaetes can be uniramous (consisting of one lobe or ramus) but are usually biramous (two lobes or rami). In the latter case, the dorsal lobes are called notopodia and the ventral lobes neuropodia. Both neuropodia and notopodia may possess a bundle of chaetae (neurochaetae and notochaetae respectively), which are highly specific and greatly diversified. A single stout internal chaeta, called an acicula, may be present in each lobe, which are used to support well-developed parapodia. Notopodia and neuropodia can also bear cirri which are tentacle-like projections of the parapodia. In some groups, such as the scale worms (e.g. Polynoidae), the dorsal cirrus is modified into a scale (or elytron). 

In most species, the anteriormost segments may be specialised into the head region and prostomium, which can result in the modification of those parapodia, loss of chaetae and elongation of the cirri into anterior-facing tentacular cirri.

Glossary of components of the parapodium

Gastropod parapodia

The fleshy protrusions on the sides of some marine gastropods are also called parapodia. They are particularly well-developed in sea butterflies. Some sea hares use their parapodia to swim. Parapodia can even be used for respiration (similar to gills) or for locomotion.

Parapodia are found in the following taxonomic groups of gastropods:
 Clade Cephalaspidea
 Clade Thecosomata
 Clade Gymnosomata
 Clade Aplysiomorpha

See also
Epitoke parapodium
Annelida

References

Annelid anatomy
Gastropod anatomy